The 1970–71 Irish Cup was the 91st edition of the premier knock-out cup competition in Northern Irish football. 

Distillery won the cup for the 12th time, defeating Derry City 3–0 in the final at Windsor Park.

The holders Linfield were eliminated in the semi-final by Derry City.

Results

First round

|}

Replay

|}

Quarter-finals

|}

Semi-finals

|}

Replay

|}

Final

References

External links
The Rec.Sport.Soccer Statistics Foundation - Northern Ireland - Cup Finals

Irish Cup seasons
1970–71 in Northern Ireland association football
1970–71 domestic association football cups